Chaetosiphonaceae is a family of green algae, in the order Bryopsidales.

References

External links 

Ulvophyceae families
Bryopsidales
Monogeneric algae families